is a Japanese actor and voice actor from Ehime Prefecture. He is a graduate of Hiroshima University, where he majored in art.

He is a member of the Nylon 100℃ theater troupe, as well as the chairman of his own troupe .

Personal life
On December 3, 2017, Kiyasu announced his marriage and that his wife had given birth to a son.

Selected filmography 
 Ojamajo Doremi Dokka~n! (Shawn)
 Kaiketsu Zorori (Paru)
 Capeta (Nobu Andou)
 Captain Tsubasa: Holland Youth (Takeshi Sawada)
 Captain Tsubasa J (Adult Takeshi Sawada)
 Captain Tsubasa: Road to 2002 (Adult Takeshi Sawada)
 Fafner of the Azure (Soushi Minashiro)
 Dear Boys (Kazuhiko Aikawa)
 The Prince of Tennis (Kaoru Kaido, Hazue Kaido, Kyosuke Uchimura, Haginosuke Taki)
 Dragon Drive (Kouhei Toki)
 Noein (Isami Fujiwara)
 Hajime no Ippo (Ippo Makunouchi)
 Whistle! (Daichi Fuwa)
 Pocket Monster Advance Challenge (Brawly)
 Yu-Gi-Oh! Duel Monsters (Akira)
 Yomigaeru Sora - Rescue Wings (Hironori Suzuki)
 Mizuiro (OVA) (Kenji Katase)
 Hanada Shōnen Shi (Amanojaku)
 The Prince of Tennis II: U-17 World Cup (Maxwell)

Video games 
 Super Robot Wars UX (Soushi Minashiro)
 Victorious Boxers (Ippo Makunouchi)
 Genshin Impact (Azhdaha)

External links 
 Nylon 100℃
 Bull Docking Headlock

References

1975 births
Living people
Hiroshima University alumni
Japanese male stage actors
Japanese male video game actors
Japanese male voice actors
Male voice actors from Ehime Prefecture